The Homecoming Concert is a live album by Tim Hardin, released in 1981. It was recorded on January 17, 1980 in the city where he was born, Eugene, Oregon. Hardin died later that year.

Background
Hardin had moved back to Seattle, Washington after living in England for a number of years. He performed infrequently and continued to struggle with his heroin addiction. A television special called The Homecoming Concert was filmed that included performances and interviews. Hardin died later that year, on December 29, 1980 of a drug overdose.

Reception 

In an uncredited review for Allmusic, the album was called "eminently rewarding" and "It shows that Hardin, who was at work on a new album at the time of his death, was the owner of a musical fire that was still burning brightly at that late date."

Track listing 
All songs by Tim Hardin except where noted.
 "Black Sheep Boy" – 2:30
 "Misty Roses" – 3:00
 "Reason to Believe" – 2:37
 "Lady Came from Baltimore" – 2:18
 "Old Blue Jeans" – 3:46
 "Hang on to a Dream" – 3:11
 "If I Were a Carpenter" – 4:00
 "Tribute to Hank Williams" – 3:49
 "Smugglin' Man" – 2:10
 "Speak Like a Child" – 2:31
 "Red Balloon" – 2:33
 "Amen" (Traditional) – 3:12

Personnel 
Tim Hardin – vocals, guitar, piano
Phil Freeman – producer
Lori Borgman – photography
Jennifer Luttow – design

References

External links 
Tim Hardin discography site.

Tim Hardin albums
Live albums published posthumously
1981 live albums